Splinter Test was used as a group name for Larry Thrasher and Genesis P-Orridge. The name was first used for a box set of reissues of the more experimental material by Psychic TV, and then it was used to issue the spoken word projects of Psychic TV or their instrumental music, before the foundation of Thee Majesty. The name refers to an essay on sampling as holographic magick by P-Orridge.

Discography

Splinter Test 1 Box Set (1993)
 Disc A:  Elipse Ov Flowers
 Disc B: Tarot Ov Abomination
 Disc C: Stained By Dead Horses
Splinter Test 2 Box Set (1993)
 Disc D: Mouth Ov Thee Knight
 Disc E: Sugarmorphoses
 Disc F: Cold Dark Matter
Thee Fractured Garden (1996)
Spatial Memory (1996)
Electric Newspaper Issue Four: The Human Voice (1997)
Sulphur - Low Seed Replication (1997)

See also
Psychic TV
Thee Majesty

External links
Discogs profile

British electronic music groups
British techno music groups
British industrial music groups